Leroy Oliver Cromartie (December 15, 1922 – September 14, 2000) was an American Negro league second baseman in the 1940s.

A native of Miami, Florida, Cromartie graduated from Booker T. Washington Senior High School in 1943. He went on to play college football for Florida A&M, where he was an All-America selection. Cromartie played in the Negro leagues for the Indianapolis Clowns in 1945, and was the father of fellow major leaguer Warren Cromartie. He died in Miami in 2000 at age 77.

References

External links
 and Seamheads

1922 births
2000 deaths
Florida A&M Rattlers football players
Indianapolis Clowns players
20th-century African-American sportspeople